Point Molate Beach Park is a city-owned park in Richmond, California, accessible only via a narrow road from the  Richmond-San Rafael Bridge toll plaza exit "Western Drive", and separate from the rest of the city.  The park is adjacent to the present day ghost town of Winehaven.

History
The Beach Park - originally part of the Point Molate Naval Fuel Depot - was leased to the City of Richmond in the early 1970s for $1.00/month and developed by the Navy as a gesture of goodwill to local residents and to provide recreation for the Navy and their families stationed at Pt. Molate.  Subsequent budget concerns and cleanup needs led to a complete closure of the park in 2001.

The park reopened in April 2014 after another round of cleanup.

The East Bay Regional Parks District has planned including the park and the Point Molate area in general as part of a new park in its long-term projects.

See also
Point Molate Naval Fuel Depot
Winehaven, California
Point San Pablo District

References

External links
Map showing park

Parks in Richmond, California
Parks in Contra Costa County, California
San Francisco Bay Area beaches
Beaches of Contra Costa County, California
Beaches of Northern California